Whitley Chapel is a village in Northumberland, England about  south of Hexham, and in the parish of Hexhamshire.

Governance 
Whitley Chapel is in the parliamentary constituency of Hexham.

Landmarks 
In Whitley Chapel Village Hall is a plaque commemorating those fallen soldiers from Hexhamshire killed in battle during the two world wars. Local historian and publisher Hilary Kristensen was behind the idea and the plaque is the fruit of nearly three years' work. The plaque was unveiled in 2009 by Hilary Kristensen, Mike Linklater and parish council chairman Brian Massey.

The names recorded on the plaque are:

Religious sites 
The church is dedicated to St Helen. The church was built in 1742 on the site of a medieval church. Renovations in the nineteenth century.

References

External links

Northumberland Communities 
http://www.hexhamshire.org.uk/church/st-helens-church-the-history/

Villages in Northumberland